John Jenkinson may refer to:

 John Jenkinson (bishop) (1781–1840), English churchman, Bishop of St David's
 John Jenkinson (British politician) (died 1805), MP for Corfe Castle
 John Jenkinson (New Zealand politician) (1858–1937), member of the New Zealand Legislative Council
 John Jenkinson (rowing) (born 1941), Australian rower who competed at the 1956 Summer Olympics
 John Wilfred Jenkinson (1871–1915), namesake of the J. W. Jenkinson Memorial Lectureship
Sir John Jenkinson, 14th Baronet (b. 1945), of the Jenkinson baronets